Rita Fromm (born 1 May 1944) was a German politician of the Free Democratic Party (FDP) and former member of the German Bundestag.

Life 
Rita Fromm was a member of the German Bundestag from 1980 to 1983. From 1989 to 2014 she was a city councillor in the Karlsruhe municipal council.

Literature

References

1944 births
Members of the Bundestag for Baden-Württemberg
Members of the Bundestag 1980–1983
Female members of the Bundestag
20th-century German women politicians
Members of the Bundestag for the Free Democratic Party (Germany)
Living people